Raphitoma pycnum is an extinct species of sea snail, a marine gastropod mollusc in the family Raphitomidae.

Description

Distribution
Fossils of this extinct marine species were found in Oligocene strata in Southwest France.

References

 Lozouet P. (1999). Nouvelles espèces de gastéropodes (Mollusca: Gastropoda) de l'Oligocène et du Miocène inférieur d'Aquitaine (sud-ouest de la France). Partie 2. Cossmanniana. 6: 1-68.
 Lozouet (P.), 2017 Les Conoidea de l’Oligocène supérieur (Chattien) du bassin de l’Adour (Sud-Ouest de la France). Cossmanniana, t. 19, p. 1-179

pycnum
Gastropods described in 1999